CHWR-FM is a First nations community radio station that operates at 89.9 FM in Whitesand, Ontario, Canada.

Owned by Whitesand Communication Group, the station was given approval by the Canadian Radio-television and Telecommunications Commission in 1996.

References

External links

Hwr
Hwr
Radio stations established in 1996
1996 establishments in Ontario